Anu Garg (born April 5, 1967) is an American author and speaker. He is also the founder of Wordsmith.org, an online community comprising word lovers from an estimated 195 countries. His books explore the joy of words. He has authored several books about language-related issues and written for magazines and newspapers. He was a columnist for MSN Encarta and Kahani magazine.

Life and education
In 1988, Garg received a B.Tech. in Computer Science from Harcourt Butler Technological Institute.
He lives in the Seattle area. In 1995, Garg received a Master's degree in Computer Science from Case Western Reserve University, where he studied on a scholarship. Garg became a naturalized US citizen in 2008. He is a vegan.

Career
He has worked as a computer scientist at AT&T and other corporations. In 1994, during his studies at Case Western Reserve University, he founded Wordsmith.org. In 2010, the number of subscribers to Wordsmith.org's "A Word A Day" email list reached one million.

Bibliography

See also
 List of Indian writers

References

External links

1967 births
Living people
American computer scientists
American information and reference writers
Case Western Reserve University alumni
Indian computer scientists
Indian emigrants to the United States
People from Woodinville, Washington
People with acquired American citizenship
People from Meerut
Scientists from Uttar Pradesh
Indian popular science writers
American male writers of Indian descent
American male non-fiction writers